In quantum computation, the Hadamard test is a method used to create a random variable whose expected value is the expected real part , where  is a quantum state and  is a unitary gate acting on the space of .

Description of the circuit 

To perform the Hadamard test we first calculate the state . We then apply the unitary operator on  conditioned on the first qubit to obtain the state . We then apply the Hadamard gate to the first qubit, yielding .

The expected value of the output will then be the difference between the two probabilities, which is 

The Hadamard test has many applications in quantum algorithms such as the Aharonov-Jones-Landau algorithm. 
Via a very simple modification it can be used to compute inner product between two states  and : instead of starting from a state  it suffice to start from the ground state , and perform two controlled operations on the ancilla qubit. Controlled on the ancilla register being , we apply the unitary that produces  in the second register, and controlled on the ancilla register being in the state , we create  in the second register. This value can be improved to  using amplitude estimation techniques.

References

Quantum computing,Quantum algorithms